Samuel McKee may refer to:

 Samuel McKee (politician, born 1774) (1774–1826), U.S. Representative from Kentucky
 Samuel McKee (born 1832) (1832–1862), Union Army colonel from Kentucky
 Samuel McKee (politician, born 1833) (1833–1898), Union Army captain and U.S. Representative from Kentucky
 Samuel B. McKee (1822–1887), American attorney and judge